The Anonymous Roylott (Italian: L'anonima Roylott) is a 1936 Italian thriller film directed by Raffaello Matarazzo and starring Camillo Pilotto, Isa Pola and Giulio Donadio. The film is an adaptation of a play set in the United States, about a murder that arises over a dispute at the Roylott chemical company.

It was shot at the Cines Studios in Rome. The film's sets were designed by the art director . It was distributed by the Italian branch of Warner Brothers.

Cast
Camillo Pilotto as Avvocato Giorgio Evans
Italo Pirani as Joe Roylott
Carlo Lombardi as Eric Roylott
Giulio Donadio as Ingegner Rogers
Romano Calò as MacKay, ispettore di polizia
Isa Pola as Helena Roylott, nipote di Joe
Mino Doro as Ing. Giorgo Harris, fidanzato di Helena
 as Peters, direttore amministrativo
Emma Baron as Jean, moglie di Peters
Olga Solbelli as Anna
Giovanni Conforti as ingegner Dixon
Paolo Stoppa as De Paoli, usciere
 as Claire, segretaria dell'avv. Evans
Mario Ferrari as Stark, capo della polizia
Corrado Antonicelli as Morris, agente di polizia
Beatrice Mancini as centralinista
Aldo Pierantoni as avvocato
Zoe Incrocci as dattilografa
Norma Nova as dattilografa
 as impiegata
Nietta Zocchi as segretaria

References

Bibliography 
 Aprà, Adriano. The Fabulous Thirties: Italian Cinema 1929-1944. Electa International, 1979.

External links 
 

1936 films
Italian thriller films
Italian black-and-white films
1930s thriller films
1930s Italian-language films
Films directed by Raffaello Matarazzo
Italian films based on plays
Films set in the United States
Cines Studios films
1930s Italian films